The 1950 Belgian Grand Prix, formally titled the Grand Prix Automobile de Belgique, was a Formula One motor race held on 18 June 1950 at Spa-Francorchamps. It was race five of seven in the 1950 World  Championship of Drivers. The 35-lap race was won by Alfa Romeo driver Juan Manuel Fangio after he started from second position. His teammate Luigi Fagioli finished second and Talbot-Lago driver Louis Rosier came in third.

Report
By the time of the Belgian Grand Prix, the pace of the season was beginning to tell, with only 14 cars arriving at the Spa circuit. These included the dominant Alfa Romeos of Nino Farina, Juan Manuel Fangio and Luigi Fagioli. Scuderia Ferrari was down to two 125s for Luigi Villoresi and Alberto Ascari, although Ascari had a new V12 engine to try out. The factory Talbot-Lago team had three cars for Louis Rosier, Yves Giraud-Cabantous and Philippe Étancelin (standing in for the injured Eugène Martin). The rest of the field was made up of Talbot-Lagos (notably one for Raymond Sommer), a single Alta and one Maserati for Toni Branca. This race was the final entry for Geoffrey Crossley, the sport's high costs forcing him, like many privateers, to retire after just a handful of races.

Farina and Fangio were fastest as usual in qualifying with Fagioli unable to match them. Sommer split the Ferraris in his old Talbot-Lago. The race would be a similar story. The Alfas went off on their own and Sommer battled with the two Ferraris. When the Alfa stopped for fuel, Sommer found himself in the unlikely position of being race leader. Unfortunately his engine blew up. Ascari took the lead but he had to stop for fuel and that meant that the Alfas went ahead again with Fangio leading Farina and Fagioli. Farina suffered transmission trouble in the closing laps and dropped to fourth behind the best of the surviving Talbot-Lagos being driven by Rosier. Ascari finished fifth.

Entries

Classification

Qualifying

Race

Notes
 – Includes 1 point for fastest lap

Championship standings after the race 
Drivers' Championship standings

 Note: Only the top five positions are listed. Only the best 4 results counted towards the Championship.

References

Belgian
Belgian Grand Prix
Grand Prix, 1950
June 1950 sports events in Europe